Jacques Edmond-Joseph Papinot (1860–1942) was a French Roman Catholic priest and missionary who was also known in Japan as .  He was an architect, academic, historian, editor, Japanologist.

Papinot is best known for creating an Historical and Geographical Dictionary of Japan which was first published in French in 1899.  The work was published in English in 1906.

Early life
Papinot was born in 1860 in Châlons-sur-Saône in France.

He was ordained as a Catholic priest in 1886; and three months later he was sent to Japan.

Career
Papinot first arrived in Japan in 1886.  He taught at the Tokyo Theological Seminary for 15 years while working on his Dictionnaire japonais-français des noms principaux de l'histoire et de la géographie de Japon.

In 1911, he left Japan for China.  He returned to France in 1920.

Selected works
In an overview of writings by and about Papinot, OCLC/WorldCat lists roughly 30+ works in 100+ publications in 7 languages and 1,200+ library holdings. 
This list is not finished; you can help Wikipedia by adding to it.
 Dictionnaire japonais-français des noms principaux de l'histoire et de la géographie de Japon, 1899
 Historical and geographical dictionary of Japan, 1906
 Nihon seiei (Japanese hymns), 1922 (with Jean-Marie-Louis Lemaréchal)

References

External links
  Papinot, Edmond at Virtual International Authority File (VIAF)
  Nobliaire du japon at Unterstein.net
  神田教会歴代主任司祭 at CatholicKandaChurch.org

1860 births
1942 deaths
French Roman Catholic priests
French Japanologists
Historians of Japan
19th-century French historians
20th-century French historians
French Roman Catholic missionaries
French male non-fiction writers
19th-century French male writers
Roman Catholic missionaries in China
Roman Catholic missionaries in Japan
French expatriates in China
French expatriates in Japan